The Storfjord Bridge is a proposed suspension bridge that would span Storfjorden in Sunnmøre, Norway. The plans have been developed by Aas-Jakobsen for a Storfjordsambandet, a company which aims to toll finance the bridge. According to Rolf M. Larssen of Aas-Jakobsen, there is a larger challenge securing sufficient funding than technically building the bridge. It is estimated to cost 4.3 billion Norwegian krone.

History
In a report made by Aas-Jakobsen, two crossings were discussed, one slightly in-fjord from the ferry and one which would cross to Ørskog. The bridge would have a single main cable and a split bridge beam. The cable would run down the centre of the bridge, with the lanes on each side of an open area with cross-sections. While this method is more expensive, it allows for a more aerodynamic bridge. The bridge would have two pylons, with the road lanes crossing on the outside of the pylons.

The crossing would establish a fixed link for Sykkylven and Stranda towards Ålesund. The service is currently operated by the Ørsneset–Magerholm Ferry on National Road 60, which had an average daily traffic of 1967 cars and 175 in 2009, making it the fifth-most trafficked ferry service in Norway. Former proposals for the crossing has included a submerged floating tunnel and a pontoon bridge, although both have since been discarded. The design is part of a project initiated by the Norwegian Public Roads Administration to develop extreme technology which would make it possible to make E39, the Coastal Highway, ferry free.

Official plans by the Road Administration have suggested that a different bridge, Sulafjord Bridge, over Sulafjorden further west to be built instead of the Storfjord Bridge. This bridge is still of a similar size.

See also
List of longest suspension bridge spans
European route E39

References

External links
 European route E39

Proposed bridges in Norway
Road bridges in Møre og Romsdal
Sykkylven